Sieniawka  is a village in the administrative district of Gmina Łagiewniki, within Dzierżoniów County, Lower Silesian Voivodeship, in south-western Poland. The village has a population of 450.

The Sieniawka Lake is located close to the village. Its tank is about 300 meters long and has retention and leisure functions. The lake is used as a recreation center (sandbeach, swimming, beach volley, small catering and campsite).

Sports
The local football club is Czarni Sieniawka. It competes in the lower leagues.

Surroundings 
 Gola Dzierżoniowska Castle
 Wojsławice Arboretum
 Medieval town of Niemcza
 Cistercian monastery at Henryków

References

Villages in Dzierżoniów County